Kenneth Hayles was a British writer who moved to Australia.

Select Credits
The Last Appointment (1954)
Companions in Crime (1954)
Track the Man Down (1955)
Murder on Approval (1955)
Stolen Assignment (1955)
Secret Venture (1955)
No Smoking (1955)
Find the Lady (1956)
Passport to Treason (1956)
The Hideout (1956)
Suspended Alibi (1957)
Blind Spot (1958)
Ghost Squad (1961)
Write Me a Murder  (1965)
The Voice (1966)
The Attack (1966)
The Link Men (1967)
The Rovers (1969)

References

External links
Kenneth Hayles at IMDb
Ken Hayles at Ausstage

British screenwriters